The 2015–16 Pro Tour season was the twenty-first season of the Magic: The Gathering Pro Tour. It started on 8 August 2015 with Grand Prix San Diego and Hong Kong and ended on 7 August 2016 with the conclusion of Pro Tour Sydney. The season consisted of 49 Grand Prix and 4 Pro Tours, located in Milwaukee, Atlanta, Madrid, and Sydney.

Mode 

Four Pro Tours and forty-nine Grands Prix were held in the 2015–16 season. These in addition to the World Championship and the World Magic Cup are the events that awarded Pro Points, the points that were used to determine the Player of the Year Standings and Pro Club levels. Players were awarded Pro Levels for earning 18 (Silver level), 33 (Gold), and 50 points (Platinum), however only the six best Grand Prix results counted. Pro Club Levels come with certain benefits such as qualifications to subsequent Pro Tours, byes at Grand Prix, and airfare to Pro Tours. Based on the final standings of Pro Tours, Grand Prix, Worlds, and the World Magic Cup Pro Points are awarded as follows:

For competitors finishing outside the final elimination stage of Grand Prix and Pro Tours points are awarded depending on their score after the final Swiss round. 16 Swiss rounds are played at Pro Tours, 15 at individual Grand Prix, and 14 at Team Grand Prix. Pro Points are then awarded as follows.

Finally players that participated in the World Championship earned one Pro Point per win in the Swiss Portion and two Pro Points per win in the single elimination stage.

Grand Prix 

GP San Diego (8–9 August 2015)
Format: Standard
Attendance: 1493
 Michael Majors
 Artur Villela
 Paul Rietzl
 Paul Yeem
 Loren Eakins
 Corey Brukhart
 Ben Weitz
 Dan Ward

GP Detroit (15–16 August 2015)
Format: Team Limited
Attendance: 2040 (680 teams)
1.
 Matt Nass
 Jacob Wilson
 Sam Pardee
2.
 Ben Stark
 Luis Scott-Vargas
 Eric Froehlich
3. 
 Owen Turtenwald
 William Jensen
 Reid Duke
4
 Brock Parker
 Matt Costa
 Shahar Shenhar

GP Hong Kong (8–9 August 2015)
Format: Limited
Attendance: 851
 Chye Yian Hsiang
 Jan Ang
 Victoriano Lim
 Liu Yuchen
 Wu Songwei
 Cheung Lap Chung
 Yam Wing Chun
 Kwok Suen Wang

GP Prague (29–30 August 2015)
Format: Standard
Attendance: 1464
 Elliot Boussaud
 Peter Vieren
 Hannes Kerem
 Davor Detecnik
 Mattia Rizzi
 Oliver Polak-Rottman
 Steve Hatto
 Alex Hottman

GP London (15–16 August 2015)
Format: Standard
Attendance: 2152
 Fabrizio Anteri
 Matteo Moure
 Erik Skinstad
 Bill Chronopoulos
 Piotr Wald
 Marco Cammilluzzi
 Martin Juza
 Daniel Fior

GP Santiago (29–30 August 2015)
Format: Limited
Attendance: 799
 Rodrigo Lopez
 Tomoharu Saitou
 Jorge Guerra
 Martin Quiroga
 Esteban Truyol
 Christian Flores
 Claudio Barrientos Ochoa
 Alberto Sanchez

Magic: The Gathering World Championship 
Seattle (27–30 August 2015)
 Prize pool: $150,000
 Format: Modern Masters Booster Draft, Standard, Magic Origins Booster Draft, Modern

Top 4 playoff

Final standings 

The following twenty-four players received an invitation to the 2015 World Championship due to their performance in the 2014–15 season. They are ordered according to the final standings of the event.

Pro Player of the year standings

Grand Prix

GP Madrid (12–13 September 2015)
Format: Limited
Attendance: 1420
 Aleksa Telarov
 Francesco Giorgio
 Ashraf Abou Omar
 Michael Bonde
 Fabrizio Anteri
 Wenzel Krautmann
 Sergiy Sushalskyy
 Antonio Del Moral León

GP Sydney (10–11 October 2015)
Format: Limited
Attendance: 996
 John Seaton
 Alex Ball
 Kelvin Chew
 Prads Pathirana
 Hironobu Sugaya
 Zen Takahashi
 Paul Costentin
 Chester Swords

GP Oklahoma City (12–13 September 2015)
Format: Modern
Attendance: 1470
 Zac Elsik
 Brian Braun-Duin
 Andrew Sullano
 Joseph Reiter
 Jasper Johnson-Epstein
 Benjamin Miller
 Paul Rietzl
 Matthew Duggan

GP Madison (10–11 October 2015)
Format: Limited
Attendance: 1820
 Raphaël Lévy
 Magnus Lantto
 Jon Graham
 Joe Lavrenz
 Paul Rietzl
 Andrew Maine
 Samuel Pardee
 Jérémy Dezani

Pro Tour Battle for Zendikar 
Milwaukee (16–18 October 2015)
 Prize pool: $250,000
 Format: Standard, Booster Draft (Battle for Zendikar-Battle for Zendikar-Battle for Zendikar)

Top 8

Final standings

Pro Player of the year standings

Grand Prix 

GP Quebec City (24–25 October 2015)
Format: Standard
Attendance: 804
 Dan Lanthier
 Omar Beldon
 Jake Mondello
 Oliver Polak-Rottmann
 Reid Duke
 Edgar Magelhaes
 Pascal Maynard
 Nicolas Béland

GP Beijing (24–25 October 2015)
Format: Team Limited
Attendance: 813 (271 teams)
1.
 Craig Wescoe
 Richard Hoaen
 Mike Hron
2.
 Yuuya Watanabe
 Makihito Mihara
 Yuuki Ichikawa
3.
 Liu Yuchen
 He Yue
 Zhang Zhiyang
4.
 Shintaro Ishimura
 Yoshihiko Ikawa
 Kazuyuki Takimura

GP Indianapolis (31 October–1 November 2015)
Format: Standard
Attendance: 1103
 Brent Clawson
 Raymond Perez Jr.
 Scott Kirkwood
 Daniel Chan
 David Phelps
 Patrick Chapin
 Valentin Mackl
 Daniel Duan

GP Lyon (31 October–1 November 2015)
Format: Limited
Attendance: 1952
 Damien Bouillot
 Christian Seibold
 Tomoharu Saitou
 Vincent Lemoine
 Branco Neirynck
 Florian Reiter
 Mark Litvak
 Felix Weidemann

GP Atlanta (14–15 November 2015)
Format: Limited
Attendance: 2073
 Tom Martell
 Owen Turtenwald
 Dan Musser
 Aryeh Wiznitzer
 Evan Smith
 Brian Eason
 Samuel Black
 Joseph Pressley

GP Pittsburgh (21–22 November 2015)
Format: Modern
Attendance: 2679
 Alex Bianchi
 Aaron Webster
 Robert Cucunato
 Craig Wescoe
 Corey Burkhart
 Robert Long
 Thien Nguyen
 Benjamin Nikolich

GP Porto Alegre (31 October–1 November 2015)
Format: Modern
Attendance: 789
 Marcos Paulo De Jesus Freitas
 Vagner Casatti
 Caio Amaral
 Alejandro Cesa
 Thiago Saporito
 Gabriel Fehr
 Guilherme Merjam
 Diego Marquez

GP Brussels (14–15 November 2015)
Format: Standard
Attendance: 1938
 Lukas Blohon
 Simon Nielsen
 Antonio Castellani
 Martin Müller
 Magnus Lantto
 Grzegorz Kowalski
 Bart Van Etten
 Ondřej Stráský

GP Seattle-Tacoma (7–8 November 2015)
Format: Legacy
Attendance: 2014
 Jarvis Yu
 Christian Calcano
 Brian DeMars
 Chase Hansen
 Andrejs Prost
 Gary Wong
 Martin Goldman-Kirst
 Xin Sui

GP Kobe (21–22 November 2015)
Format: Standard
Attendance: 2571
 Takuma Morofuji
 Joe Soh
 Akio Chiba
 Shota Takao
 Pavel Matousek
 Shunsuke Takahira
 Akihiro Okawa
 Shuhei Nakamura

World Magic Cup 
Barcelona (11–13 December 2015)
 Prize pool: $250,000 
 Format: Team Constructed, Team Limited

Top 8

Final standings

Grand Prix 

GP Oakland (9–10 January 2016)
Format: Standard
Attendance: 1928
 Reid Duke
 Ben Rubin
 Woodrow Engle
 Cody Lingelbach
 Josh McClain
 Justin Nguyen
 Brett Sinclair
 Nathaniel Smith

GP Mexico City (30–31 January 2016)
Format: Limited
Attendance: 787
 Fabrizio Anteri
 Tomoharu Saitou
 Rodrigo Goncalves Dos Santos
 Cristian Velasco
 Martin Dang
 Leonardo Ivan Ruiz Rivera
 Robert Wallerstein
 Marcio Carvalho

GP Vancouver (30–31 January 2016)
Format: Limited
Attendance: 1929
 Adam Jansen
 Jérémy Dezani
 Nick Slind
 Gabriel Carlton-Barnes
 Allen Sun
 Aeo Paquette
 Chris Hewitt
 Eric Severson

GP Nagoya (30–31 January 2016)
Format: Limited
Attendance: 2565
 Tomonori Hirami
 Ryota Takeuchi
 Ikuya Asai
 Fujimura Kazuaki
 Park Jun-young
 Shawn McNeace
 Sean Li
 Satoshi Haji

Pro Tour Oath of the Gatewatch 
Atlanta (5–7 February 2016)
 Prize pool: $250,000
 Format: Modern, Booster Draft (Oath of the Gatewatch-Oath of the Gatewatch-Battle for Zendikar)

Top 8

Final standings

Pro Player of the year standings 
At the end of this event, the top ranking player in Pro Points, Owen Turtenwald, was awarded the "Mid-season master" title, which will yield him an invitation to the 2016 World Championship.

Grand Prix 

GP Houston (27–28 February 2016)
Format: Standard
Attendance: 1851
 Owen Turtenwald
 Andrew Cuneo
 Mark Jacobson
 Brock Mosley
 Cody Lingelbach
 Brock Parker
 Chapman Sim
 Amir Radmard

GP Melbourne (5–6 March 2016)
Format: Modern
Attendance: 1105
 David Mines
 Maitland Cameron
 Yuuki Ichikawa
 Louis Thomson-Gregg
 Chris Cousens
 Kentaro Yamamoto
 Lee Shi Tian
 Jason Chung

GP Detroit (5–6 March 2016)
Format: Modern
Attendance: 2553
 Ralph Betesh
 Evan Buchholz
 Eric English
 Huang Hao-shan
 Gerry Thompson
 Eduardo Sajgalik
 James Zornes
 Ronnie Ritner

GP Washington, D.C. (12–13 March 2016)
Format: Team Limited
Attendance: 3366 (1122 teams)
1.
 Justin Cohen
 Matt Severa
 Mike Hron
2.
 Richard Hoaen
 Tom Martell
 Ian Spaulding
3.
 Owen Turtenwald
 William Jensen
 Reid Duke
4.
 Matthew Nass
 Jacob Wilson
 Sam Pardee

GP Bologna (5–6 March 2016)
Format: Modern
Attendance: 2181
 Kayure Patel
 Alberto Mattioli
 Giuseppe Reale
 Ruben Perez
 Fabrizio Anteri
 Jaroslav Boucek
 Mattia Rizzi
 Alessandro Lippi

GP Paris (19–20 March 2016)
Format: Standard
Attendance: 1510
 Petr Sochůrek
 Ben Stark
 Ryoichi Tamada
 Martin Jůza
 Arne Huschenbeth
 Giuseppe Reale
 Fabian Friedrich
 Paolo Magnani

GP Beijing (16–17 April 2016)
Format: Limited
Attendance: 1056
 Hironobu Sugaya
 Xu Su
 Kazuaki Fujimura
 Gao Zhen Xing
 Makihito Mihara
 Kentarou Yamamoto
 Toru Inoue
 Mak Wai Hou

GP Albuquerque (16–17 April 2016) 
Format: Limited
Attendance: 1266
 Allen Wu
 William Craddock
 Jacob Thiessen
 Seth Manfield
 Michael Simon
 Jiachen Tao
 Christian Keeth
 Rick Chong

GP Barcelona (16–17 April 2016) 
Format: Limited
Attendance: 2084
 Fabrizio Anteri
 Mehdi Saadi
 William Jensen
 Viktors Kazanskis
 Brian Braun-Duin
 Shaun McLaren
 Reid Duke
 Ferran Vila

Pro Tour Shadows over Innistrad 

Pro Tour Shadows over Innistrad was the 100th Magic: The Gathering Pro Tour. For the Top 8 single elimination stage the mode was modified from previous Pro Tours. Previously only the first game was played unsideboarded with players having access to their sideboard for all subsequent games in a match. From PT Shadows over Innistrad on, players only have access to their sideboard beginning with the third game of a Top 8 match. The Pro Tour's Top 8 included some of the most successful Magic players of all time, including Hall of Famers Jon Finkel, Luis Scott-Vargas, and Shouta Yasooka.

Tournament data 
 Location: Madrid (22–24 April 2016)
 Prize pool: $250,000
 Format: Standard, Booster Draft (Shadows over Innistrad)

Top 8

Final standings

Pro Player of the year standings

Grand Prix 

GP Toronto (30 April–1 May 2016)
Format: Standard
Attendance: 1727
 Robert Lombardi
 Jon Stern
 Oliver Tiu
 Doug Potter
 Josh Buitenhuis
 Brett Tetley
 Bradley Robinson
 Michael Sheng

GP Los Angeles (21–22 May 2016)
Format: Modern
Attendance: 2239
 Simon Slutsky
 Ethan Brown
 Javier Dominguez
 Pascal Maynard
 Joe Lossett
 Corey Burkhart
 Alex To
 Erik Carson

GP Manchester (28–29 May 2016)
Format: Standard
Attendance: 1697
 Raphaël Lévy
 Julien Henry
 Oscar Christensen
 Jonas Friberg
 Lauri Vuorela
 Matthew Hunt
 Christoffer Larsen
 Adam Bajerowicz

GP Columbus (11–12 June 2016)
Format: Legacy
Attendance: 1824
 Clay Spicklemire
 Joe Lossett
 Noah Walker
 Christopher Walton
 Wilson Hunter
 Raymond Cornely
 Jarvis Yu
 Aaron Kasprzak

GP São Paulo (2–3 July 2016)
Format: Team limited
Attendance: 1086 (362 teams)
1.
 Francisco Barciella
 Carlos Romão
 Eloi Pattaro
2.
 Jonathan Melamed
 Mateus Martins
 Paulo Martinello
3. 
 Pascal Maynard
 Brian Braun-Duin
 Shaheen Soorani
4
 Renato Pinto
 Leonardo Labruna
 Diego Coelho

GP Montreal (30–31 July 2016)
Format: Limited
Attendance: 1348
 Hunter Cochran
 Hugo Demers
 Felix Tse
 Morgan McLaughlin
 Robert Lombardi
 Philippe Gareau
 Michael Ferneyhough
 Jamie Madill

GP New York (7–8 May 2016)
Format: Standard
Attendance: 2007
 Seth Manfield
 Louis Deltour
 Scott Lipp
 Michael Majors
 Mike Sigrist
 Daniel Ward
 Brandon Ayers
 Ralph Batesh

GP Charlotte (21–22 May 2016)
Format: Modern
Attendance: 2399
 Andreas Ganz
 Jon Bolding
 Robert Graves
 Mike Sigrist
 Jacky Wang
 Adonnys Medrano
 Sam Black
 Eli Kassis

GP Costa Rica (4–5 June 2016)
Format: Standard
Attendance: 497
 Seth Manfield
 Brandon Fischer
 Oliver Tiu
 Erick Manuel Lopez Basulto
 Brian Braun-Duin
 Michael Derczo
 Saul Alvarado
 Javier Dominguez

GP Taipei (25–26 June 2016)
Format: Standard
Attendance: 792
 Yuuki Ichikawa
 Huang Yung-Ming
 Lee Shi Tian
 Yuuta Takahashi
 Lieu Chien-Hung
 Mingrerk Setsompop
 Shawn McNeace
 Liu Yuchen

GP Stockholm (30–31 July 2016)
Format: Limited
Attendance: 1244
 Elmer van Eeghen
 Matteo Moure
 Andreas Reling
 Erik Wahlberg
 Bjornar Prytz
 Yannick Studer
 Max Pritsch
 Federico Del Basso

GP Tokyo (7–8 May 2016)
Format: Standard
Attendance: 3335
 Riku Kumagai
 Kazushige Suzuki
 Takuma Morofuji
 Carlos Ballester
 Kazuki Yada
 Takaya Saito
 Kensuke Kato
 Eng Chu Heng

GP Minneapolis (28–29 May 2016)
Format: Standard
Attendance: 1530
 Alexander Johnson
 Shota Takao
 Andrew Elenbogen
 Matt Severa
 Max McVety
 Owen Turtenwald
 Reed Hartman
 Yuuya Watanabe

GP Prague (11–12 June 2016)
Format: Legacy
Attendance: 1477
 Rodrigo Togores
 Nicolas Tholance
 Thomas Enevoldsen
 Alexander Hayne
 Niels Molle
 Lukas Blohon
 Gianluca Gazzola
 Arnaud Baglin

GP Pittsburgh (25–26 June 2016)
Format: Standard
Attendance: 1379
 Evan Petre
 Pascal Maynard
 Steve Rubin
 William Cruse
 Adam Ragsdale
 Eric Flickinger
 Matt Tumavitch
 Aleksa Telarov

GP Sydney (30–31 July 2016)
Format: Limited
Attendance: 1076
 Scott Lipp
 Jan Ksandr
 Ben Stark
 Seth Manfield
 Zen Takahashi
 Santiago De Paoli
 Thierry Ramboa
 Ben Seck

Pro Tour Eldritch Moon 
Sydney (5–7 August 2016)
 Prize pool: $250,000
 Format: Standard, Booster Draft

Top 8

Final standings

Pro Player of the Year final standings 
The 2015–16 Pro Tour season ended after Pro Tour Eldritch Moon. These are the final standings of the Player of the Year race, including every player who at the end of the season reached Platinum, the highest Pro Club Level.

Invitees to the 2016 World Championship 

The following twenty-four players received an invitation to the 2016 World Championship due to their performance in the 2015–16 season.

References 

Magic: The Gathering professional events